Stahls Automotive Collection is a private automotive collection in Chesterfield Township, Michigan, US. It is the personal collection of Detroit native Ted Stahl, the chairman of fabric-based heat printer GroupeSTAHL in St. Clair Shores.

The collection contains over 90 cars housed in a  garage, most of which are from the Art Deco era and the Great Depression. The collection focuses mostly on American cars, including former makes such as Auburn, Cord, Duesenberg, Oldsmobile, Pontiac, and Packard in addition to cars built by Cadillac, Chevrolet, Chrysler, and Ford. Stahls purchases vehicles largely based on their degree of innovative engineering and their importance to the development of automobile design.

The oldest car in the collection is an 1899 De Dion-Bouton tricycle, and the first one that Ted Stahl purchased is a 1930 Ford Model A Roadster Deluxe. Among the most prominent cars in the collection are a 1934 Duesenberg Model J, a Tucker 48, and a handful of cars built for films, such as The Great Race, How the Grinch Stole Christmas, and The Reivers. In 2021, the collection acquired a Chrysler Turbine Car, one of only nine to survive and one of only two in a private collection (the other belonging to Jay Leno).

In addition to the cars, the collection also includes about 20 musical instruments, including a Wurlitzer theater pipe organ. There is a separate "music room" featuring orchestrions and other automated musical instruments.

The collection is open to the public at no charge on Tuesday afternoons and the first Saturday of each month. Regular events at the collection include an annual Autos for Autism fundraiser, which benefits the Ted Lindsay Foundation, and a Veterans Day open house.

References

External links 
 
 Chesterfield: Stahls Automotive Collection on Destination Michigan (PBS)

Private collections in the United States
Automobile museums in Michigan
Museums in Macomb County, Michigan